Swimming Pool is a 1976 Indian Malayalam-language film, directed by J. Sasikumar, starring Kamal Haasan, M. G. Soman, Sumithra, Rani Chandra and Thikkurissy Sukumaran Nair.

Cast 
Kamal Haasan
M. G. Soman
Sumithra
Rani Chandra
Thikkurissy Sukumaran Nair
Bahadoor
Sankaradi
Paravoor Bharathan

Production 
Swimming Pool film directed by J. Sasikumar, produced by Thayyil Kunjikandan under production banner Chelavoor Pictures. This film was shot in black-and-white. It was given an "U" (Unrestricted) certificate by the Central Board of Film Certification.

Soundtrack 

The music was composed by M. K. Arjunan and the lyrics were written by Vayalar Ramavarma, P. Bhaskaran and Bharanikkavu Sivakumar.

References

External links 
 

1970 films
1970s Malayalam-language films
Films directed by J. Sasikumar